The term Greek Catholic Church can refer to a number of Eastern Catholic Churches following the Byzantine (Greek) liturgy, considered collectively or individually.

The terms Greek Catholic, Greek Catholic Church or Byzantine Catholic, Byzantine Catholic Church may refer to:
 Individually, any of the 14 out of 23 Eastern Catholic Churches that use the Byzantine rite, a.k.a. Greek Rite:
 the Albanian Greek Catholic Church
 the Belarusian Greek Catholic Church
 the Bulgarian Greek Catholic Church
 the Greek Catholic Church of Croatia and Serbia
 the Greek Byzantine Catholic Church, in Greece and Turkey
 the Hungarian Greek Catholic Church
 the Italo-Albanian Catholic Church
 the Macedonian Greek Catholic Church
 the Melkite Greek Catholic Church
 the Romanian Greek Catholic Church (officially the Romanian Church United with Rome, Greek-Catholic)
 the Russian Greek Catholic Church
 the Ruthenian Greek Catholic Church
 the Slovak Greek Catholic Church
 the Ukrainian Greek Catholic Church
 Any other group of Eastern Catholics following the Byzantine rite:
 the Georgian Byzantine-Rite Catholics 
 an Ordinariate for Eastern Catholic faithful without proper ordinary, in 6 countries
 The Catholic Church in Greece, the Latin Church Catholic hierarchy in Greece

See also 

 Albanian Catholic Church
 Belarusian Catholic Church
 Bulgarian Catholic Church
 Croatian Catholic Church
 Hungarian Catholic Church
 Romanian Catholic Church
 Russian Catholic Church
 Serbian Catholic Church
 Slovak Catholic Church
 Ukrainian Catholic Church

Lists of churches